Siegfried Line Museum may refer to the following Second World War museums:

 Siegfried Line Museum, Irrel, housed in an old bunker at Irrel, Germany
 Siegfried Line Museum, Pirmasens, housed in an old bunker at Niedersimpten, near Pirmasens, Germany